The American Association of Nurse Anesthetists (AANA) is the professional association of nurse anesthetists in the United States. The organization states that it has a membership of more than 59,000, includes Certified Registered Nurse Anesthetist (CRNA) and student (SRNA) members. The organization represents approximately 90 percent of CRNAs in the United States. The AANA headquarters is currently located in Park Ridge, Illinois, a suburb of Chicago.

The AANA held its first meeting on June 17, 1931. Agatha Hodgins organized the event, inviting members from the Alumnae Association of the Lakeside Hospital School of Anesthesia and other nurse anesthetists from across the United States.  As a new organization, it had two main objectives: establish a national qualifying exam, and establish an accreditation program for nurse anesthesia schools. The first national certification exam was held on June 4, 1945, with 92 candidates sitting for the exam.

The AANA has accredited nurse anesthesia programs since January 19, 1952. The organization was recognized as an accrediting body by the U.S. Department of Education in 1955.

Name change
In August 2021, the organization changed its name from American Association of Nurse Anesthetists to American Association of Nurse Anesthesiology as part of a rebranding effort. This name change, along with the organization's acknowledgement of the descriptor "nurse anesthesiologist" was subsequently condemned by the American Society of Anesthesiologists (ASA). The ASA represents physician anesthesiologists who have completed their MD or DO degrees and a residency training program in Anesthesiology, whereas the AANA represents CRNAs, a type of Advanced practice nurse.

Journal
AANA Journal -  is the association's journal.

References

External links
 AANA Official Website

Nursing organizations in the United States
Advanced practice registered nursing
Medical and health organizations based in Illinois
Anesthesiology organizations
Hospital nursing